José Romário Silva de Souza (born 1 March 1994 in Ceará-Mirim), simply known as Romarinho or Jesus, is a Brazilian professional footballer who plays as a forward for Fortaleza.

Romarinho has made over 100 competitive appearances for Fortaleza.

Career statistics

Honours
Fortaleza
Campeonato Brasileiro Série B: 2018
Campeonato Cearense: 2019, 2020, 2021, 2022
Copa do Nordeste: 2019, 2022

References

External links
 
 

1994 births
Living people
People from Ceará-Mirim
Brazilian footballers
Association football forwards
Campeonato Brasileiro Série A players
Campeonato Brasileiro Série B players
Campeonato Brasileiro Série C players
Campeonato Brasileiro Série D players
ABC Futebol Clube players
Globo Futebol Clube players
América Futebol Clube (RN) players
Fluminense FC players
Fortaleza Esporte Clube players
Sportspeople from Rio Grande do Norte